Under the Tuscan Sun is a 2003 American romantic comedy-drama film written, produced, and directed by Audrey Wells and starring Diane Lane. Based on Frances Mayes' 1996 memoir of the same name, the film is about a recently divorced writer who buys a villa in Tuscany on a whim, hoping it will lead to a change in her life. The film was nominated for the Art Directors Guild Excellence in Production Design Award, and Diane Lane received a Golden Globe Award nomination for her performance.

Plot
Frances Mayes is a San Francisco writer whose seemingly perfect life takes an unexpected turn when she learns that her husband has been cheating on her. The husband, who had been working on his writing and had no income, ironically, was allowed to petition for alimony. As a one-time settlement, however, the agreement was for Frances to quit claim her 1/2 ownership of the home. The divorce—and the loss of her house to her ex-husband and his much-younger, pregnant new partner—leaves her depressed and unable to write. Her best friend Patti, who is expecting a child with her girlfriend Grace, is worried that Frances might never recover from the traumatic divorce. She urges Frances to take an Italian vacation to Tuscany using the ticket she purchased before she became pregnant. At first, Frances refuses, but after another depressing day in her gloomy temporary apartment, she decides that it's a good idea to get away for a while.

In Tuscany, her tour group stops in the small town of Cortona. After wandering through the charming streets, she notices a posting for a villa for sale in Cortona. She rejoins her tour group on the bus, and just outside town, the bus stops to allow a flock of sheep to cross the road. While they wait, Frances realizes that they've stopped directly in front of the very villa that she had seen for sale—something she believes is a sign. She asks the driver to stop, and she gets off the bus. Through a series of serendipitous events, she becomes the owner of a lovely yet dilapidated villa in beautiful Tuscany.

Frances begins her new life with the help of a variety of interesting characters and unusual but gentle souls. She hires a crew of Polish immigrants to renovate the house. Over time, Frances also befriends her Italian neighbors and develops relationships with her Polish workers, the realtor who sold her the villa, and Katherine, an eccentric aging British actress who evokes the mystery and beauty of an Italian film star. Later, she is visited by the now very pregnant Patti, whose partner Grace has left her.

Frances meets and has a brief romantic affair with Marcello, but their relationship does not last. She is about to give up on happiness when one of her Polish workers, a teenager named Pawel, and a neighbor's young daughter come to her for help. Her father does not approve of him, due to his being Polish and not having a family, yet they are very much in love and want to get married. Frances persuades the girl's family to support their love, by proclaiming that she is Pawel's family, and the young lovers are soon married at the villa. During the wedding celebration, Ed, an American writer appears unexpectedly. The writer, whose novel Frances had previously edited and critiqued harshly, is traveling in Tuscany and heard about her residence there. Their attraction for each other points to a romantic future.

Cast

Production

Development
In November 1998, producer Tom Sternberg was filming the psychological thriller The Talented Mr. Ripley (1999) in Northern Italy. In the penultimate week of its seventeen-week shooting schedule, the crew was working in the Tuscan town of Pienza in the province of Siena. After finishing the shooting day, Sternberg, director Anthony Minghella and actor Matt Damon met Frances Mayes and her husband Ed at a nearby wine bar where the couple was picking out wine glasses. Astounded to meet the author, Sternberg had read Mayes's 1996 memoir Under the Tuscan Sun a year earlier but initially not considered it for film treatment. In March 2000, Sternberg met Mayes again in Los Angeles, where they were guests of the Tuscan Film Commission. Upon their reencounter, Sternberg reread the book and realized its potential as a film. Sternberg and executive producer Mark Gill gave the book to Audrey Wells and asked to hear her take on how to adapt it for the screen. Wells envisioned Under The Tuscan Sun to be a "lush, classical romantic comedy whose point is that if you stop looking for love, love will find you."

Filming locations
 Banca CR Firenze, Cortona, Tuscany, Italy (interiors, bank scene)
 Cassa di Risparmio di Firenze, Cortona, Tuscany, Italy (real estate transaction scene with a judicial scrivener)
 Teatro Signorelli, Cortona, Italy (movie date with Pawel)
 Cinecittà Studios, Cinecittà, Rome, Lazio, Italy (bookstore, Patti & Grace's San Francisco apartment)
 Cortona, Arezzo, Tuscany, Italy
 Florence, Tuscany, Italy
 Montepulciano, Siena, Tuscany, Italy (leaving Cortona, wedding)
 Positano, Salerno, Campania, Italy
 Rome, Lazio, Italy

 Borgo De Celli, Umbria, Italy

 San Francisco, California, United States
 Montepulciano, Tuscany, Italy (flag-waving show)
 Teatro Signorelli, Cortona, Arezzo, Tuscany, Italy (interiors)

Reception

Box office
Under the Tuscan Sun opened well in the United States, where it came in second to The Rundown at the box office during the weekend of September 28, 2003, grossing $9,751,425 on 1,226 screens. This was more than half of its estimated $18 million budget. The film was a box office success, earning $43,610,723 domestically and a further $15,268,000 internationally, totaling $58,878,723 worldwide.

Critical response

The film received mixed reviews from critics, although there was strong praise for Lane's performance. The review aggregator website Rotten Tomatoes reported that 62% of critics gave the film a positive rating, based on 155 reviews, with an average score of 6.2/10. Its consensus states: "Though formulaic and superficial, Under the Tuscan Sun is redeemed by Lane's vibrant performance." On Metacritic, which uses a normalized rating system, the film holds a 52/100 rating, based on 34 reviews, indicating "mixed or average favourable reviews".

Mick LaSalle of the San Francisco Chronicle remarked that "it would be easy [...] to call the entire plot of Under the Tuscan Sun a mere excuse to show us beautiful things and Lane's reaction to them. [But] despite stiff competition from the natural surroundings, Lane's face is not just the witness to beauty but also the thing itself in this stunning-looking film." Roger Ebert, writing for the Chicago Sun-Times, gave Under the Tuscan Sun three out of four stars. He called the film an "alluring example of yuppie porn, seducing audiences with a shapely little villa in Italy [...] What redeems the film is its successful escapism, and Lane's performance." Similarly Boston Globes Ty Burr found that Under the Tuscan Sun "plays as a warmly soothing yuppie-makeover daydream, and it goes down like limoncello – sweet, not very good for you, but irresistible just the same."

Mike Clark from USA Today declared the film "a fun movie to sit through even when you don't always buy it [...] If the scenery and Lane's charm hook you early on, you'll probably go with the flow. And the movie is all Lane." Seattle Times critic Moira MacDonald felt that "despite the formulaic plot, which seems to belong on the Lifetime channel, Wells has a knack for witty dialogue that keeps things moving along [...] As escapism and as winsome travelogue, Under the Tuscan Sun works just fine." Red Reed, writing for The Observer was critical with the film's overplotted third act, but added: "File [it] under guilty pleasures, but I loved [the film] unconditionally [...] The epitome of what a feel-good movie is supposed to be but rarely is, this one is beautiful to look at and life-affirming to think about, and it doesn't have a pretentious bone in its head."

In her review for Salon, Stephanie Zacharek was more cutting, saying: "For a movie about moving to Italy and bedding a hot Italian stallion, this sterile fantasy is about as sexy as a rusty olive oil can [...] Under the Tuscan Sun pretends to be juicy, but it doesn't allow any dribbles. It purports to make love all over us, but not without laying down lots of paper towels first." 
Lisa Schwarzbaum of Entertainment Weekly graded the film with a 'C+' rating, summarizing it as a "a golden vise of women's romance-pic clichés." Los Angeles Times critic Manohla Dargis wrote that "it’s a pleasure to watch Lane's delicately lived-in face tremble with feeling – it's the truest thing in the movie – but the character's desperation feels wrong, the worst kind of sellout [...] The movie pretends it’s peddling a vision of 'you-go-girl' independence in which it doesn't remotely believe."

Accolades

See also
 Under the Tuscan Sun, the memoir on which the film is based

References

External links

 
 
 
 

2003 films
2003 comedy films
2003 drama films
2003 LGBT-related films
2003 romantic comedy-drama films
American LGBT-related films
American romantic comedy-drama films
2000s English-language films
Films based on American novels
Films scored by Christophe Beck
Films set in the Amalfi Coast
Films set in Tuscany
Films shot in Tuscany
Films with screenplays by Audrey Wells
Lesbian-related films
LGBT-related romantic comedy-drama films
Touchstone Pictures films
2000s American films